Winter Mountain is the stage name of singer-songwriter Joseph 'Joe' Francis (vocals, guitars, bass, piano, harmonica), based in  Cornwall, England. The genre of music is predominantly indie folk / rock. He has supported Seal, Richard Thompson, The Waterboys and many others as well as touring internationally. 

Initially a duo, Winter Mountain, (Francis and Irish songwriter Marty Smyth) toured the UK and Ireland extensively, becoming recognised for their close vocal harmonies (similar in style to that of Simon and Garfunkel) and distinctive songwriting. They attracted the attention of many major record companies before signing to indie label 'Charcoal Records' in 2011. In 2015, after releasing one album together, Smyth left Winter Mountain and Francis opted to keep the name for his solo work.

In summer of 2016 Francis performed one of his first solo shows as Winter Mountain, opening for Seal. Later that same week, a solo Winter Mountain opened for The Feeling and the lead singer of Elbow, Guy Garvey.
 
Winter Mountain released the self-produced I Swear I Flew on his Astral Fox Records label in November 2016. A song from the record, "The Lucky Ones", received radio play across the UK and Europe from multiple stations including BBC Radio 2. 
Extensive grass roots touring followed the release, including a two-week Spring Full Band Tour of the UK, Winter Mountains first with a full backing band. 
Solo support sets for folk star and occasional Winter Mountain collaborator Seth Lakeman on his March 2017 UK tour included performances at The Minack Theatre, Cornwall, The Hexagon, Reading and The Stables, Milton Keynes. 

In June 2017, Francis toured as support for Ben Ottewell, lead singer of British indie group Gomez on the Irish / UK leg of Ottewell's 'A Man Apart' world tour.

History 
The signing of his first band to a London based Indie label led to Francis recording his debut album of original music at Abbey Road Studios, London. In 2008 Joe travelled to Memphis where he demoed some new material at Sun Studios, Memphis.

Francis and former member Martin Smyth met in 2009 while both were traveling by train to Memphis, Tennessee. After the two performed and wrote together in Memphis, and later New York City, Francis visited Smyth at his home in Donegal, Ireland, and shortly afterwards formed Winter Mountain. They began touring after winning a 'battle of the bands' competition in Derry, Northern Ireland. Their prize was two days at a local recording studio. They used the session to record what would become their debut EP, which featured five original songs.

After a year of performing in pubs and folk clubs across the UK and Ireland, Winter Mountain were given the opportunity to accompany Northern Irish folk singer Cara Dillon at a theatre in Donegal. They presented their EP to Dillon's husband and manager Sam Lakeman and shortly afterwards, signed to Dillon and Lakemans fledgling label Charcoal Records. Their debut album Winter Mountain, produced by Sam Lakeman and recorded at multiple vintage studios throughout the UK including Rockfields and State of the ark, was released in 2013 to much acclaim. Soon after the release Winter Mountain signed to Faber Music Publishing. 

Smyth left Winter Mountain in 2015. 

In the year that followed Francis travelled Ireland, The UK and France. Whilst on the road he wrote and demoed the songs that were to form Winter Mountains second album I Swear I Flew. Upon his return to Cornwall, he began the process of recording the new songs at Cube Studios. During the recording process Francis set up his own Astral Fox Records and began planning the self-release of the album. I Swear I Flew was released to critical acclaim in November 2016. 

Winter Mountain has supported Seal, Ben Ottewell of Gomez, Guy Garvey of Elbow, The Feeling, Ocean Colour Scene, Leann Rhimes, Cara Dillon, Benny Gallagher, Seth Lakeman, Fleet Foxes, Paolo Nutini, Sara and Sean Watkins (formerly of Nickel Creek), Rosanne Cash, Richard Thompson, Grammy award winner Patty Griffin and others.

Discography
Winter Mountain
I Swear I Flew

References 

British folk rock groups
Folk music duos
Musical groups established in 2009